Megaselia is a genus of flies in the family Phoridae.

See also
 List of Megaselia species

References

Phoridae
Platypezoidea genera
Taxa named by Camillo Rondani